Ouémé may refer to:
Ouémé Department, one of the twelve departments of Benin
Ouémé River, a river in the countries of Benin and Nigeria
Ouémé River Basin